In mathematics, subadditivity is a property of a function that states, roughly, that evaluating the function for the sum of two elements of the domain always returns something less than or equal to the sum of the function's values at each element. There are numerous examples of subadditive functions in various areas of mathematics, particularly norms and square roots. Additive maps are special cases of subadditive functions.

Definitions
A subadditive function is a function , having a domain A and an ordered codomain B that are both closed under addition, with the following property:

An example is the square root function, having the non-negative real numbers as domain and codomain,
since  we have:

A sequence , is called subadditive if it satisfies the inequality

for all m and n. This is a special case of subadditive function, if a sequence is interpreted as a function on the set of natural numbers.

Note that while a concave sequence is subadditive, the converse is false.

Properties

Sequences
A useful result pertaining to subadditive sequences is the following lemma due to Michael Fekete.

The analogue of Fekete's lemma holds for superadditive sequences as well, that is:
  (The limit then may be positive infinity: consider the sequence .)

There are extensions of Fekete's lemma that do not require the inequality  to hold for all m and n, but only for m and n such that  

Moreover, the condition  may be weakened as follows:  provided that  is an increasing function such that the integral  converges (near the infinity).

There are also results that allow one to deduce the rate of convergence to the limit whose existence is stated in Fekete's lemma if some kind of both superadditivity and subadditivity is present.

Besides, analogues of Fekete's lemma have been proved for subadditive real maps (with additional assumptions) from finite subsets of an amenable group 

,
and further, of a cancellative left-amenable semigroup.

Functions

If f is a subadditive function, and if 0 is in its domain, then f(0) ≥ 0. To see this, take the inequality at the top. . Hence 

To see this, one first observes that .

The negative of a subadditive function is superadditive.

Examples in various domains

Entropy

Entropy plays a fundamental role in information theory and statistical physics, as well as in quantum mechanics in a generalized formulation due to von Neumann.
Entropy appears always as a subadditive quantity in all of its formulations, meaning the entropy of a supersystem or a set union of random variables is always less or equal than the sum of the entropies of its individual components.
Additionally, entropy in physics satisfies several more strict inequalities such as the Strong Subadditivity of Entropy in classical statistical mechanics and its quantum analog.

Economics

Subadditivity is an essential property of some particular cost functions. It is, generally, a necessary and sufficient condition for the verification of a natural monopoly. It implies that production from only one firm is socially less expensive (in terms of average costs) than production of a fraction of the original quantity by an equal number of firms.

Economies of scale are represented by subadditive average cost functions.

Except in the case of complementary goods, the price of goods (as a function of quantity) must be subadditive. Otherwise, if the sum of the cost of two items is cheaper than the cost of the bundle of two of them together, then nobody would ever buy the bundle, effectively causing the price of the bundle to "become" the sum of the prices of the two separate items.  Thus proving that it is not a sufficient condition for a natural monopoly; since the unit of exchange may not be the actual cost of an item.  This situation is familiar to everyone in the political arena where some minority asserts that the loss of some particular freedom at some particular level of government means that many governments are better; whereas the majority assert that there is some other correct unit of cost.

Finance
Subadditivity is one of the desirable properties of coherent risk measures in risk management. The economic intuition behind risk measure subadditivity is that a portfolio risk exposure should, at worst, simply equal the sum of the risk exposures of the individual positions that compose the portfolio. In any other case the effects of diversification would result in a portfolio exposure that is lower than the sum of the individual risk exposures. The lack of subadditivity is one of the main critiques of VaR models which do not rely on the assumption of normality of risk factors. The Gaussian VaR ensures subadditivity: for example, the Gaussian VaR of a two unitary long positions portfolio  at the confidence level  is, assuming that the mean portfolio value variation is zero and the VaR is defined as a negative loss,

Since variance is always positive,

Thermodynamics
Subadditivity occurs in the thermodynamic properties of non-ideal solutions and mixtures like the excess molar volume and heat of mixing or excess enthalpy.

Combinatorics on words
In combinatorics on words, a common problem is to determine the number  of length- words in a factorial language.

For every , sample two strings of length  uniformly at random on the alphabet . The exact value of even , however, is only known to be between 0.788 and 0.827.

See also

Notes

References
György Pólya and Gábor Szegő. "Problems and theorems in analysis, volume 1". Springer-Verlag, New York (1976). .
Einar Hille. "Functional analysis and semi-groups". American Mathematical Society, New York (1948).
N.H. Bingham, A.J. Ostaszewski. "Generic subadditive functions." Proceedings of American Mathematical Society, vol. 136, no. 12 (2008), pp. 4257–4266.

External links

Mathematical analysis
Sequences and series
Types of functions